El Chavo is a TV series aired between 1973 and 1980 originally titled of El Chavo del Ocho.

El Chavo may also refer to:

 El Chavo Animado
 El Chavo (character)
 El Chavo (video game)

See also
 Chavo